Stangeland is a borough of the city of Sandnes in the west part of the large municipality of Sandnes in Rogaland county, Norway. The small,  borough has a population (2016) of 7,560.  The borough is located just southwest of downtown Sandnes.

References

Boroughs and neighbourhoods of Sandnes